Tormos is a municipality in the province of Alicante and autonomous community of Valencia, Spain.

Notable people
José Perelló Torrens (Tormos, Alicante, 1885–1955) was a Republican politician in Spain and the Mayor of Tormos during the 1930s.

References

Populated places in the Province of Alicante